Charter High of the Arts Multimedia and Performing (or CHAMPS) is a public charter high school in Van Nuys, Los Angeles, California.

History
Dr. Norman Isaacs began CHAMPS high school in 2005. Before becoming the founder of CHAMPS, Isaacs worked as the principal of Robert A. Millikan Middle School Performing Arts Magnet in Sherman Oaks. CHAMPS was founded in order to create a high school where students could receive a curriculum in academics, digital media, visual, and performing arts.

The school specializes in performing and digital media arts. It is one of two arts high schools that allow students to study there from any district within the Los Angeles County (the other being the Los Angeles County High School for the Arts).  Students who want to enroll in a specific academy (dance, music, drama, media arts, or robotics) need an audition to get in. Each academy has a separate audition process. Enrolled students can change into a different academy with the approval of the department chairs and counselors.

References

External links
 CHAMPS: Charter High School of the Arts Multimedia and Performing

High schools in Los Angeles County, California
High schools in the San Fernando Valley
Educational institutions established in 2005
Charter high schools in California
Van Nuys, Los Angeles
2005 establishments in California